Prince Iakob Levanis Dze Bagration-Gruzinsky (1757-1835) was a Georgian royal prince (batonishvili) of Bagrationi dynasty. He was son of Levan Gruzinsky.

Prince Iakob married Princess Vera Petrovna Urusova (1765-1835) and had 8 children:
Demetre
Nikoloz (1783-1861)
Petre (1785-1812)
Aleksandra (1787-1853)
Iakob (1793-1866)
Sergo (1795-1880)
Vera (1801-1860)
Aleksandre (1802-1828)

References

1757 births
1835 deaths
House of Mukhrani
Georgian princes